Al-Masajid is a village in Bani Matar District of Sanaa Governorate, Yemen.

History 
The earliest known reference to al-Masajid is in 859 (245 AH), in the Ghayat al-amani of Yahya ibn al-Husayn, in connection with the destruction of the Rayʽan dam. The same work also records a battle taking place at al-Masajid in 1617 (1026 AH). It describes al-Masajid as a source of waters reaching the Wadi Zahr.

References 

Villages in Sanaa Governorate